Alexander J. Bellamy (born 1975) is an academic who directs the Asia-Pacific Centre for the Responsibility to Protect and is a professor in the department of peace and conflict studies at University of Queensland.

Works

References

Academic staff of the University of Queensland
1975 births
Living people
Peace and conflict scholars